Myrmicini is a tribe of ants in the subfamily Myrmicinae. It is not to be confused with the very similar-sounding tribes Myrmecinini (also in subfamily Myrmicinae) and Myrmeciini, which is in the subfamily Myrmeciinae. While the type genus of Myrmicini is Myrmica, that of Myrmeciini is Myrmecia and that of Myrmecinini Myrmecina.

Genera
Manica Jurine, 1807
Myrmica Latreille, 1804
†Plesiomyrmex Dlussky & Radchenko, 2009
†Protomyrmica Dlussky & Radchenko, 2009

References

External links

Myrmicinae
Ant tribes